The following is a list of massacres of Azerbaijanis that have occurred throughout history.

During pre-Soviet times, the term "Caucasian Tatar" was used for the group who is nowadays called "Azerbaijanis." For instance, this is apparent in the designation Armenian–Tatar massacres. However, these terms are today and in this article interchangeable.

See also
 Anti-Azerbaijani sentiment

Notes

References

Bibliography

 
 
 

Anti-Azerbaijanism